Serious Sam: The Second Encounter is a first-person shooter video game developed by Croteam and originally published by Gathering of Developers. First released on Microsoft Windows on 5 February 2002. It is the second episode following Serious Sam: The First Encounter released a year prior. Both episodes were combined into one game and ported to the Xbox. High-definition remakes of both episodes were released in 2009 and 2010 on Microsoft Windows, and were later ported to the Xbox 360, Nintendo Switch, PlayStation 4, and Xbox One video game consoles.

The series follows the adventures of protagonist Sam "Serious" Stone and his fight against the forces of the notorious extraterrestrial overlord Mental who seeks to destroy humanity.

A fan-made level-pack, Dark Island, was included in Serious Sam: Gold. The games are on separate CDs (in the UK version) and are identical to their individual releases, except that the Sam character model for The First Encounter was modified to match the one used in The Second Encounter. After the release of the remakes, both titles had "Classic" added to the name to prevent confusion.

Gameplay 
Identical to Serious Sam: The First Encounter'''s gameplay, The Second Encounter consists almost entirely of the player attempting to defeat dozens of enemies at a time in wide-open arena-like areas and thus is relatively simple. Virtually no changes have been made to the gameplay since The First Encounter, but the sequel includes different environments unlike the Egyptian aesthetic that was featured in every level in The First Encounter. Some fights also feature gravity manipulated rooms including a closed-in room where a bridge collapses from underneath the player to reveal a rubberized floor where the player and several enemies chaotically bounce around.

The game features 7 new enemies and 4 new weapons, including a chainsaw, a sniper rifle, a flamethrower, and the Serious Bomb that is featured in Serious Sam's logo. The bomb was designed as a last-ditch effort to clear away a wave of enemies if combat becomes too overwhelming. All weapons and enemies from The First Encounter make a return to this game. Unlike the first game where it featured one boss in the final level, The Second Encounter features three bosses. The game also introduces 4 power-ups that quadruple the player's damage output, as well as giving them a brief burst of running speed, invulnerability, and invisibility.

Like its predecessor, The Second Encounter features cooperative gameplay through a split-screen mode and via the internet. This game has also seen the release of a level-pack titled Dark Island, featuring fan-made levels for single and multiplayer mode.

 Plot The Second Encounter begins where The First Encounter left off, with Sam traveling to Sirius on the SSS Centerprice. Unfortunately, the starship is accidentally hit by the "Croteam crate-bus" and plummets down to Earth's surface. As the starship falls, Sam reads the coordinates and frets about crash-landing into Egypt again, but instead crashes into Chiapas in the Mayan age, with the starship now heavily damaged upon impact. However, not all hope is lost, since the Sirians left a "back-up starship" on Earth, which was a fail-safe in case anything ever happened to the SSS Centerprice. However, since this back-up starship is located in a different time and age than where and when Sam currently is, he will have to uncover the locations of the Sirian portals that will help him reach his destination. With this new objective, Sam storms through Teotihuacan, then travels to Babylon and Persepolis and finally to medieval Poland where the back-up starship is located. During his journey, Sam battles two of Mental's portal guardians: a powerful Mayan spirit named Kukulkan the Wind God and a biomechanical creature called the Exotech Larva. Finally, in front of the Cathedral of Sacred Blood, Sam confronts the last obstacle to overcome on his path to the Holy Grail, Mordekai the Summoner. After a glorious battle with Mordekai and his spawning minions, The Summoner is finally silenced forever. In the Cathedral, Sam lifts the Holy Grail in the palms of his hands, followed by his sarcastic confessions of his sins in a booth to Mental, during which he tells Mental that "he's coming to get him." During the end credits, Sam activates the back-up starship, which turns out to be a rocket, and travels back into space toward Sirius, with the "Croteam Big-Heads" cheering him on. The story continues in Serious Sam 2.

 Development 
Croteam created their own engine for use in both The First Encounter and The Second Encounter. Named the "Serious Engine", it is designed to cope with extremely large view distances and massive numbers of models by implementing level of detail rendering. Most contemporary FPS engines were developed for a limited draw distance and only a few animating models (i.e. enemies) on screen at a time. The Serious Engine is very efficient, capable of maintaining dozens of moving enemies (often stampedes) and enormous enemies, even on a modest system challenging the well known id Tech, Unreal Engine or Source engines. The "Serious Engine" can render through both Direct3D or OpenGL and, while it does not support pixel or vertex shaders, it is optimized for Direct3D 7's hardware transformation, clipping and lighting. The "Serious Engine" is available for licensing from Croteam.

A more powerful iteration of the "Serious Engine" was developed for use in Serious Sam 2 and is known as "Serious Engine 2". It supports many features of modern GPUs such as pixel and vertex shaders, HDR, bloom, and parallax mapping.

Serious Engine 3 was used in Serious Sam HD: The First Encounter and Serious Sam HD: The Second Encounter. It includes detailed shading, and enemies are completely remodeled to look more realistic. This engine is also being developed to harness the full capacity of HDR and High Definition mapping. An updated version, Serious Engine 3.5, is used in Serious Sam 3: BFE.

The latest version is the Serious Engine 4, which Croteam used in their most recent game, The Talos Principle.

In March 2016, Croteam released Serious Engine v1.10 as free and open source software on GitHub under the GNU General Public License v2.The Second Encounter soundtrack featured three instrumental songs from the Croatian heavy-metal band Undercode.

 Xbox version 
On 12 November 2002, both The First Encounter and The Second Encounter were combined into one game and ported to the Xbox titled Serious Sam. The game had notable differences from the PC counterparts, including the model of Sam being changed from the model of The First Encounter to a more cartoon style Sam, removing the shades to make him look less like Duke Nukem and more like he does today.

The Xbox version includes all of the levels from both PC games, though some were modified due to the memory constraints of the Xbox console. As a result, the levels were made smaller by removing the areas outside of the playing area, and some larger levels were split into two smaller ones. Unlike the PC versions where the player can walk almost infinitely away from the playing area, the game restricts them from going too far.

The gameplay was given a more arcade touch. A life system was implemented into the single-player game making use of the score. The player is granted a new life for every 100,000 points, which allows respawning at the place of death rather than at a save point. Combo points were added for killing multiple enemies at the same time, which allows a faster increase in the player's score.

Further changes to the game include the addition of treasure, weapons that were added into The Second Encounter can now be found in some of The First Encounter levels, and a different save system. Due to the hardware limitations of the Xbox, instead of allowing the player to manually save at any point during a level in PC versions, there are save points that are designated by red phone booths that can be found in each level. Auto-aiming was also added to the Xbox version to compensate for the degree of control usually offered by a keyboard and mouse setup.

 Remake 
Croteam took their publishing rights from 2K Games to new startup Devolver Digital, after 2K Games became uninterested in Serious Sam, waiting for their long rival Duke Nukem Forever to finish.
Both episodes were remade using Serious Engine 3 featuring updated visuals, better performance and lush environments, all in high-definition. The remakes featured 16-player online co-op (4-player in the Xbox Live Arcade version), deathmatch and a new game-mode called "Co-Op Tournament".

The remake of the first episode, Serious Sam HD: The First Encounter, was released on 24 November 2009 for Microsoft Windows through Steam, on 13 January 2010 for Xbox 360 through the Xbox Live Arcade and on 20 March 2017 for Linux through Steam thanks to the Fusion Engine.
The remake of the second episode, Serious Sam HD: The Second Encounter, was released on 28 April 2010 for Microsoft Windows through Steam, on 22 September 2010 for Xbox 360 through the Xbox Live Arcade and on 4 April 2017 for Linux through Steam, again thanks to the Fusion Engine.
On 14 January 2011, the DLC titled "Fusion" was released on Steam, which merged the levels of The First Encounter into The Second Encounter. This DLC was free for everyone who owned both encounters on Steam.
Additionally, The Second Encounter HD was expanded with new piece of DLC called "Legend of the Beast". Released on 15 May 2012, it contained new maps for the Survival and Multiplayer modes and a new, short set of campaign missions.

 Reception The Second Encounter was met with positive reviews, with an overall ratio of 85/100 on Metacritic, and the Game of the Month February 2002 by GameSpot.

Greg Kasavin of GameSpot stated that the "improved level design makes the action more enjoyable than before."

Elliott Chin of Computer Gaming World awarded the game 4 stars out of 5, and stated that the game "offers just enough new content to warrant being called a sequel...It is like Doom II was to Doom."GameSpot presented The Second Encounter'' with its annual "Best Budget Game on PC" award.

In a 2016 report, the Ministry of Youth and Sports of Turkey accused the game of Islamophobia for depicting fights near, and therefore assaults on, scenery resembling the tomb of Ali.

Notes

References

External links 
 

2002 video games
Devolver Digital games
First-person shooters
Gathering of Developers games
Indie video games
Multiplayer and single-player video games
Serious Sam
Video game sequels
Video games developed in Croatia
Video games set in Egypt
Video games set in Iran
Video games set in Iraq
Video games set in Mexico
Video games set in Poland
Windows games
Xbox games